The Monte Carlo Story is a 1956 romantic comedy-drama film written and directed by Samuel A. Taylor, based on an original story by Taylor, Marcello Girosi and Dino Risi. Marcello Girosi produced the film, which was the first shot in the Technirama process. Jean Louis designed the costumes.

The film stars Marlene Dietrich and Vittorio De Sica, with Arthur O'Connell, Natalie Trundy, Jane Rose, Clelia Matania, Alberto Rabagliati, Mischa Auer and Renato Rascel.

Plot
 
The story takes place against the backdrop of the glorious French Riviera.  Marlene Dietrich plays a woman with a lot of class, but no money to satisfy her taste for the best things in life. She is dazzled by Count Della Fiabe, who is also trying to recuperate his debts at the gambling tables of the famous casino. To attract the woman, who he thinks is his meal ticket, the poor Italian noble man enlists the help of the same people to whom he owes money.

The film's most famous scene comes toward the end when Marlene Dietrich sings "Back Home in Indiana" in a seedy bistro for the enjoyment of Homer Hinckley, who she feels will be the man to make her rich.

Cast
 Marlene Dietrich as Maria de Crevecoeur
 Vittorio De Sica as Conte Dino della Fiaba
 Arthur O'Connell as Mr. Homer Hinkley
 Jane Rose as Mrs. Edith Freeman
 Mischa Auer as Hector
 Clelia Matania as Sophia
 Truman Smith as Mr. Fred Freeman
 Alberto Rabagliati as Albert
 Carlo Rizzo as Henri
 Frank Colson as Walter Peeples
 Natalie Trundy as Jane Hinkley
 Renato Rascel as Duval

External links
 
 
 
 
 Movie locations for Monte Carlo Story

1956 films
1956 comedy-drama films
1956 directorial debut films
1950s American films
1950s English-language films
1950s Italian films
1950s romantic comedy-drama films
American romantic comedy-drama films
English-language Italian films
Films scored by Renzo Rossellini
Films set in hotels
Films set in Monaco
Films shot in Monaco
Films shot in Rome
Italian romantic comedy-drama films
United Artists films